Events from the year 1619 in art.

Events

Paintings
Girolamo da Ponte - Gianfrancesco Sagredo (Ashmolean Museum, Oxford)
Guercino - 
Return of the Prodigal Son
The Raising of Lazarus
Diego Velázquez - Adoration of the Magi

Births
February 24 - Charles Le Brun, painter (died 1690)
April 2 - Onofrio Gabrieli, Italian painter (died 1706)
May - Philips Wouwerman, Dutch painter (died 1668)
June - Jan Victors, Dutch painter of subjects from the Bible (died 1679)
August 15 - Hubertus Quellinus, Flemish Baroque engraver (died 1687)
November - Willem Kalf, Dutch painter (died 1693) 
November 5 - Philip de Koninck, Dutch landscape painter (died 1688)
date unknown
Francesco Boschi, Italian painter, active mainly in Florence (died 1675)
Hieronymus Joachims – Austrian painter (died 1660)
Francesco Merano, Italian painter mainly active in his native Genoa (died 1657)
Pietro Montanini, Italian painter (died 1689)
Giuseppe Nuvolone, Italian painter active mainly in Milan, Brescia, and Cremona (died 1703)
Pietro Paolo Naldini, Italian sculptor (died 1691)
probable - Otto Marseus van Schrieck, painter of the Dutch Golden Age (died 1678)

Deaths
January 7 – (burial) Nicholas Hilliard, English miniaturist (born 1547)
March 28 - Daniel Soreau, German still life painter (born 1560)
April 16  - Denis Calvaert, Flemish painter (born 1540)
April/May - William Larkin, English painter (born early 1580s)
June 18 - Martin Fréminet, French painter and engraver (born 1567)
November 13 – Lodovico Carracci, Italian painter  (born 1555)
date unknown
François Quesnel, French painter of Scottish extraction (born 1543)
Lorenz van Steenwinckel, Flemish-Danish architect and sculptor (born 1585)
Hieronymus Wierix, Flemish engraver (born 1553) 

 
Years of the 17th century in art
1610s in art